Kentrochrysalis consimilis is a species of moth of the family Sphingidae.

Distribution 
It is known from the southern part of the Russian Far East, eastern China, North Korea, South Korea and central and southern Japan.

Description 
The wingspan is 62–72 mm. It is similar to Kentrochrysalis streckeri, but can be distinguished by the less dentate forewing upperside discal lines and the two distinct antemedian lines, ending at the inner margin in a blackish patch that is prolonged basad.

Biology 
Adults are on wing from late April to early August in Korea.

The larvae have been recorded feeding on Ligustrum obtusifolium in Korea.

References

Sphingulini
Moths described in 1903
Moths of Japan